Kamen Hadzhiev (born 22 September 1991) is a Bulgarian international footballer who currently plays as a defender or defensive midfielder for Hebar Pazardzhik.

Career
Born in Kochan, Hadzhiev began his football career playing for club Rodopa. He was included in the 18-man squad to face CSKA Sofia in an A Group match on 19 May 2007. Hadzhiev, subsequently, made his professional debut in the match, at the age of 15 years and 8 months, coming on as a substitute in the 88th minute.

In 2008 Hadzhiev joined the Wattenscheid 09 Academy in Germany. In the 2008–09 season, he made 18 appearances for the U-19 squad, scoring 5 goals. In 2009, he joined Schalke 04's youth academy.

In July 2010, Hadzhiev signed with Pirin Gotse Delchev. He made his league debut against Botev Krivodol on 31 July, playing the full 90 minutes. Hadzhiev has been a regular starter during the season in the second division, playing 30 matches. On 18 September 2010, he netted Pirin's only goal in their 2–1 loss against Sportist Svoge.

In December 2011, Hadzhiev joined Minyor Pernik.

On 1 June 2017, Hadzhiev signed with Beroe.

On 6 July 2022, Pakhtakor Tashkent announced that Hadzhiev had left the club after his contract was terminated by mutual agreement.

In November 2022, he returned to his home country, joining newly promoted Hebar.

International
He was first called up to the Bulgaria national football team in March 2018 for friendlies against Bosnia and Herzegovina and Kazakhstan, but remained on the bench. He made his debut on 14 October 2019 in a Euro 2020 qualifier against England. He started the game and played the whole match, making many mistakes as Bulgaria lost 0–6.

Career statistics

References

External links

1991 births
Living people
Bulgarian footballers
Bulgaria international footballers
First Professional Football League (Bulgaria) players
Eerste Divisie players
PFC Rodopa Smolyan players
PFC Pirin Gotse Delchev players
PFC Minyor Pernik players
FC Lokomotiv 1929 Sofia players
VfB Oldenburg players
Fortuna Sittard players
PFC Beroe Stara Zagora players
Puskás Akadémia FC players
Association football defenders
Expatriate footballers in Germany
Bulgarian expatriate sportspeople in Germany
Expatriate footballers in the Netherlands
Bulgarian expatriate sportspeople in the Netherlands
Expatriate footballers in Hungary
Bulgarian expatriate sportspeople in Hungary